The 2012–13 Korisliiga season was the 73rd season of the Finnish national championship named Korisliiga, the highest professional basketball league in Finland. Bisons Loimaa successfully defended its title.

Regular season

Playoffs

References

Korisliiga seasons
Finnish
Koris